Pierrot is a stock character in pantomime.

 Pierrot Grenade, a Caribbean carnival character

Pierrot may also refer to:

Books
 Pierrot (poem), a 1926 poem by Langston Hughes
 "Pierrot", poem by Sara Teasdale
 "Pierrot" (short story), an 1882 short story by Guy de Maupassant

Entertainment
 Pierrot (company), an anime production studio
 Pierrot's Troupe, a theatre group in New Delhi, India

Music
 Pierrot (band), a Japanese rock band
"Pierrot", a song by Luiz Bonfá and Maria Toledo from the 1965 album Braziliana
"Pierrot", a song by Steve Hackett from the 1988 album Momentum
 "Pierrot" (Aya Kamiki song),  2006
"Pierrot", a work by Thea Musgrave
"Pierrot", a work by Ernesto Nazareth
"Pierrot", a song composed by Charles Tomlinson Griffes to poem by Sara Teasdale

People
 a nickname of the French name Pierre
 Pierrot troupe or Pierrot show, British variety shows popular from the 1920s to the 1940s
 George Arnold (poet) (1834–1865), American journalist and poet who went by this name
 Pierrot (Tamás Z. Marosi) (born 1969), Hungarian pop singer, game designer and musician
 Frantzdy Pierrot (born 1995), Haitian association footballer.

Other
 Tarucus, a butterfly genus containing many species known as Pierrots
 Pierrot (painting), a painting by Antoine Watteau